Priola is a surname. Notable people with the surname include:

Giusto Priola (born 1990), Italian footballer
J. John Priola (born 1960), American contemporary visual artist
Kevin Priola (born 1973), American politician
Marguerite Priola (1849–1876), stage name of the French opera singer Marguerite-Marie-Sophie Polliart